In number theory, a Sidon sequence is a sequence  of natural numbers in which all pairwise sums  (for ) are different. Sidon sequences are also called Sidon sets; they are named after the Hungarian mathematician Simon Sidon, who introduced the concept in his investigations of Fourier series.

The main problem in the study of Sidon sequences, posed by Sidon, is to find the maximum number of elements that a Sidon sequence can contain, up to some bound .  Despite a large body of research, the question remained unsolved.

Early results
Several years earlier, James Singer had constructed Sidon sequences with  terms less than x.

Infinite Sidon sequences

That is, infinite Sidon sequences are thinner than the densest finite Sidon sequences.

Ajtai, Komlós, and Szemerédi improved this with a construction of a Sidon sequence with

The best lower bound to date was given by Imre Z. Ruzsa, who proved that a Sidon sequence with

exists. Erdős conjectured that an infinite Sidon set  exists for which  holds. He and Rényi showed the existence of a sequence  with the conjectural density but satisfying only the weaker property that there is a constant  such that for every natural number  there are at most  solutions of the equation .  (To be a Sidon sequence would require that .)

Erdős further conjectured that there exists a nonconstant integer-coefficient polynomial whose values at the natural numbers form a Sidon sequence.  Specifically, he asked if the set of fifth powers is a Sidon set. Ruzsa came close to this by showing that there is a real number  with  such that the range of the function  is a Sidon sequence, where  denotes the integer part. As  is irrational, this function  is not a polynomial.  The statement that the set of fifth powers is a Sidon set is a special case of the later conjecture of Lander, Parkin and Selfridge.

Relationship to Golomb rulers
All finite Sidon sets are Golomb rulers, and vice versa.

To see this, suppose for a contradiction that  is a Sidon set and not a Golomb ruler. Since it is not a Golomb ruler, there must be four members such that . It follows that , which contradicts the proposition that  is a Sidon set. Therefore all Sidon sets must be Golomb rulers. By a similar argument, all Golomb rulers must be Sidon sets.

See also
 Moser–de Bruijn sequence
 Sumset

References

Number theory
Combinatorics